Condica dolorosa is a moth of the family Noctuidae. It is found in the Indo-Australian tropics, including Borneo, Hawaii, Hong Kong, India, Sri Lanka, Taiwan and Queensland in Australia.

Description
The wingspan is about 40 mm. Adults are dark brown with a complex pale spot near the centre, and an irregular pale mark near the base of the inner margin of each forewing. The hindwings are brown, fading towards the base. Larva smooth, pale green with the anal somite conical. Dorsal and lateral series of purple-brown blotches speckled with white. There is a sublateral series of white dots present. Pupa is greenish with reddish somital bands.

Ecology
Larvae feed on various Asteraceae species, including Conyza and Elephantopus species. The larvae are smooth and yellowish-green with violet markings. Pupation takes place in the soil.

References

Condicinae
Moths of Asia
Moths of Japan
Moths described in 1865